Teresa "Terri" Dwyer (born 31 July 1973) is a British television presenter and actress, best known for her role as Ruth Osborne in the British soap opera Hollyoaks. She has also presented the ITV home makeover show 60 Minute Makeover.

Career
Terri Dwyer began her career as a model and in 1995 won the part of Ruth Osborne in the British soap opera Hollyoaks, making her first appearance in January 1996. After leaving Hollyoaks in 2001, she participated in the Channel 4 reality tv show The Games and went on to win a gold medal. In that same year, she appeared on Lily Savage's Blankety Blank.

In 2003, Dwyer briefly returned to Hollyoaks and also became a regular presenter on the ITV programme Loose Women (2003–2006). In 2005, she joined the cast of Grange Hill, playing the part of school teacher, Miss Adams. In June 2006, Terri helped ITV Play launch a new show: Rovers Return Quiz Night. She was one of the main presenters on the programme, alongside Paul Hendy.

Dwyer left ITV Play in June 2006, after accepting the job as main presenter on ITV's 60 Minute Makeover, taking over from fellow Loose Women star Claire Sweeney, who left to join a theatre production. Dwyer later left the show as part of a cost-cutting exercise by ITV.

In 2007, Terri co-presented Coronation Street/Emmerdale Confidential on ITV along with Jeremy Edwards (who played the husband of Dwyer's character in Hollyoaks).

Dwyer also made a guest appearance on the comedy Bo' Selecta in 2002.

Dwyer also appeared in a one-off episode (episode 12) of the series Mile High. Dwyer played the role of a passenger within a group of people who share a fear of flying.  She encounters an intimate moment with the character Captain Croker. Dwyer's character seduces the Captain onto the beach where she strips to her underwear and swims to a remote beach, where he shortly follows. It is implied that the two characters attempt to have sex, but fail due to the Captain's inability to "get it up".

Dwyer made regular appearances on This Morning from 2010 until 2012.

Personal life
Terri has an older sister, Tina, an older brother, Tony (who has 4 children), and a younger brother, Terry. Her mother Doreen died of ovarian cancer in 1996, and her father Tony died of stomach cancer in 2003. Terri herself nearly died in a car crash in 1991.

Dwyer married Sean Marley at Dalmeny village church, near Edinburgh, on 5 September 2004. She nearly missed her own wedding, as she was stuck in traffic. Dwyer gave birth to her first child, a son named Caiden Ajay Marley in Birkenhead, Merseyside, on 1 March 2006. Terri gave birth to her second son, Kylan Jones Marley on 3 November 2009.

Filmography
TV
Hollyoaks (1996–2001, 2003–2004, 2008) – Ruth Osborne
The Games (2003) – Contestant
Loose Women (2003–2006) – Panellist
Grange Hill (2005) – Miss Adams
Rovers Return Quiz Night (2006) – Co-presenter
60 Minute Makeover (2007–2009) – Presenter
This Morning (2010–2012) – Various roles
Film
 Break as Cathy - also acted as producer

References

External links
Official Website 
Official Twitter

Terri Dwyer at IMDb

1973 births
Living people
English soap opera actresses
Reality show winners
People from Syston